Clare Foley is an American actress. She is known for playing the roles of Ruby Taylor in Do No Harm, Ashley in Sinister, a young version of Piper in Orange Is the New Black and Ivy Pepper, a version of Pamela Isley in the first two seasons of Gotham appearing in a cameo role in the show's third season to pass the role to actress Maggie Geha.

References

External links
 
 

Living people
American film actresses
American television actresses
American child actresses
2001 births